William Martin Smallwood (April 30, 1873 – November 21, 1949) was an American football coach. He served as the head football coach at Allegheny College in Meadville, Pennsylvania.  He held that position for the 1898 season.  His coaching record at Allegheny was 4–4.  Smallwood died in 1949.

References

External links
 

1873 births
1949 deaths
Allegheny Gators football coaches
People from Warsaw, New York